A Jew is a member of the Jewish people.

Jew may also refer to:

Places in the United States
 Jew Mountain, a mountain in Montana
 Jew Peak, a mountain in Montana
 Jew Point, a cape in Florida
 Jew Valley, a basin in Oregon

People
 Ed Jew (born 1960), an American politician
 Yuri "Keith" Jew, an American League of Legends player
 Sollie Cohen (1907–1966), an American college football player nicknamed "Jew"

Arts and entertainment

Films
 The Jew (film) (Portuguese: O judeu), a 1995 historical film
 The Jews (film) (French: Ils sont partout), a 2016 comedy film

Literature
 The Jew (play), a 1794 play by Richard Cumberland
 The Jew (Turgenev) (Russian: Zhid), an 1847 story
 The Jews (play) (German: Die Juden), a 1754 play
 The Jews, a 1922 book by Hilaire Belloc

Other uses in arts and entertainment
 Jews, a 2008 BBC4 documentary series about Jewish life in modern Britain

Other uses
 Jew (word), a term passed into the English language from Greek
 The Jew (periodical), published by Solomon Henry Jackson

See also
Der Jude (The Jew) (1916–1928), a periodical founded by Martin Buber
 Jiu (disambiguation)
 JOO (disambiguation)
 JU (disambiguation) 
 Juju, objects and spells used in religious practice, as part of witchcraft in West Africa